Led Zeppelin's 1973 North American Tour was the ninth concert tour of North America by the English rock band. The tour was divided into two legs, with performances commencing on 4 May and concluding on 29 July 1973. Rehearsals took place at Old Street Film Studios in London.

History
The tour took place shortly after the release of Led Zeppelin's chart-topping fifth album, Houses of the Holy. Prior to its commencement, Led Zeppelin's manager Peter Grant hired PR consultant Danny Goldberg for promotion, and booked large stadium venues. The resulting tour broke box office records across North America. On May 5 at Tampa Stadium, Florida, they played to 56,800 fans (breaking the record set by The Beatles at Shea Stadium in 1965), and grossed $309,000 (US$ in  dollars). In total, this tour grossed over $4,000,000 (US$ in  dollars).

Led Zeppelin's shows evolved from those on previous tours, with the introduction of dry ice, laser effects, backdrop mirrors, hanging mirror balls and Catherine wheel pyrotechnics. Their dress attire also took on a more flamboyant nature, evidenced in particular by guitarist Jimmy Page's hummingbird jacket and John Paul Jones' Spanish matador jacket. This increase in on-stage theatricality was later referred to by Page during an interview he gave to rock journalist Mick Wall:

Three sold-out shows at Madison Square Garden in New York City that concluded the tour were filmed for a motion picture, but the theatrical release of this project (The Song Remains the Same) was delayed until 1976. The film documents the theft of $203,000 of the group's money from a safe deposit box at the Drake Hotel in New York, just before their final show. The theft was discovered by Led Zeppelin tour manager Richard Cole, who was immediately interrogated by police as a suspect. The sum of money was the band's takings from their three New York concerts. It was never recovered and the identity of the thief or thieves has never been discovered. The band later sued the Drake Hotel for the theft.

Led Zeppelin hired for the first time The Starship – a former United Airlines Boeing 720B passenger jet. During the early part of the tour the band had hired a small private Falcon Jet to journey from city to city, but these aircraft are comparatively light and susceptible to air turbulence. After performing at Kezar Stadium in San Francisco on June 2, they encountered bad turbulence on a flight back to Los Angeles. As a result, Grant resolved to hire The Starship for the remainder of the tour, at a cost of $30,000. The exterior of the plane was re-sprayed with Led Zeppelin emblazoned down the side of the fuselage.

Flying on The Starship, Led Zeppelin were now no longer required to change hotels so often. They could base themselves in large cities and travel to and from concerts within flying distance. After each show, the band members would be transported direct by limousine from the concert venue to the airport, as depicted in the concert film, The Song Remains the Same.

In an interview with William Burroughs in 1975, Page commented on the exhausting nature of the 1973 tour:

In a more recent interview, Page recalled:

Vocalist Robert Plant said:

"I got to see Led Zeppelin at very close quarters on that tour, travelling as part of their entourage," recalled Roy Harper. "The level of their success then was unbelievable… Being so close to them at the time, it was difficult to be objective about it all – you know, I was going along on the bus. But Zeppelin in full flight was an incredibly intense experience."

Tour set list
The song "No Quarter" from the band's recent album release, Houses of the Holy, was played for the first time on this tour. The band also dropped their acoustic set, which was not revived until the Earl's Court shows in May 1975.

The fairly typical set list for the tour was:

 "Rock and Roll" (Page, Plant, Jones, Bonham)
 "Celebration Day" (Jones, Page, Plant)
 "Bring It On Home" (intro) (Dixon, Page, Plant) / "Black Dog" (Page, Plant, Jones)
 "Over the Hills and Far Away" (Page, Plant)
 "Misty Mountain Hop" (Page, Plant, Jones)
 "Since I've Been Loving You" (Page, Plant, Jones)
 "No Quarter" (Page, Plant, Jones)
 "The Song Remains the Same" (Page, Plant)
 "The Rain Song" (Page, Plant)
 "Dazed and Confused" (Page)
 "Stairway to Heaven" (Page, Plant)
 "Moby Dick" (Page, Jones, Bonham)
 "Heartbreaker" (Bonham, Page, Plant)
 "Whole Lotta Love" (Bonham, Dixon, Jones, Page, Plant)

Encores (variations of the following list):
 "The Ocean" (Bonham, Jones, Page, Plant)
 "Communication Breakdown" (Bonham, Jones, Page)
 "Thank You" (Page, Plant) (Played on 3 June and 29 July)
 "Dancing Days" (Page, Plant) (Played on 13 July)

There were some set list substitutions, variations, and order switches during the tour.

Tour dates

References

External links
 Comprehensive archive of known concert appearances by Led Zeppelin (official website)
 Led Zeppelin concert setlists
 Article on the tour in Rolling Stone magazine
 View in Google Earth

Led Zeppelin concert tours
1973 concert tours